Hafiz Hakki Pasha (24 April 1878, Edirne, Ottoman Empire – 15 February 1915; Erzurum), was a general of the Ottoman Army.

Career 
Hafiz Hakki was a classmate of Enver Pasha, Mahmud Kâmil Pasha, and Fahreddin Pasha. He graduated from the Ottoman Military Academy second in his class (Fahreddin was first, Enver was fourth, Mahmud Kâmil was eighth) and graduated from the Ottoman Military College first in his class (Enver was second, Mahmud Kâmil was fourth, Fahreddin was seventh) on 5 December 1902. He was known as one of the "Freedom Heroes" in 1908.

Hafiz Hakki fought in the Balkan wars in 1912 and then wrote books about how armies should be led.

General Hakkı was one of the Ottoman commanders at the Battle of Sarikamish. At this battle, the large Ottoman army was utterly defeated by a smaller Russian force. During the retreat, the Ottoman army was nearly annihilated, mostly due to bitterly cold temperatures.

Personal life
On 17 February 1910 he married the Ottoman Princess Behiye Sultan, eldest survived daughter of Şehzade Mehmed Selaheddin, son of Sultan Murad V.

Death
Hafız was appointed by Enver Pasha to take over the remnants of the Ottoman army in the Caucasus in early 1915. He died of typhus in Erzerum in 1915 just a few weeks later.

Sources

1878 births
1915 deaths
People from Bitola
People from Manastir vilayet
Macedonian Turks
Ottoman Army generals
Ottoman military personnel of the Balkan Wars
Ottoman military personnel killed in World War I
Ottoman Military Academy alumni
Ottoman Military College alumni
Deaths from typhus